Geronimo's Cadillac is the debut album of American singer-songwriter Michael Martin Murphey, released on May 25, 1972 by A&M Records (4358). Recorded at Columbia Recording Studios in Nashville, Tennessee and London, England, the album is considered one of his finest albums. The title track was Murphey's first Top 40 hit, and was also recorded by Cher and Hoyt Axton. The Monkees recorded "What Am I Doing Hangin' 'Round?" in June 1967 for their album Pisces, Aquarius, Capricorn & Jones Ltd.. John Denver recorded "Boy from the Country" in 1980 for his album Some Days Are Diamonds. Geronimo's Cadillac peaked at number 160 on the Billboard 200.

Critical response

Geronimo's Cadillac received an editorial rating of five out of five stars on the AllMusic website. In his review, Mike DeGagne called it one of Murphey's finest albums. DeGagne concluded:

Track listing
 "Geronimo's Cadillac" (Murphey, Charles John Quarto) – 4:38
 "Natchez Trace" (Murphey) – 4:02
 "Calico Silver" (Murphey, Larry Cansler) – 4:08
 "Harbor for My Soul" (Murphey, Larry Cansler) – 3:16
 "Rainbow Man" (Murphey, Charles John Quarto) – 3:07
 "Waking Up" (Murphey) – 3:30
 "Crack Up in Las Cruces" (Murphey, Craig Hillis) – 4:40
 "Boy from the Country" (Murphey, Owen Castleman) – 4:36
 "What Am I Doin' Hangin' Around?" (Murphey) – 2:32
 "Michael Angelo's Blues (Song for Hogman)" (Murphey) – 3:23
 "Backslider's Wine" (Murphey) – 2:43
 "The Light of the City" (Ray Lewis) – 4:07

Personnel
Music
 Michael Martin Murphey – vocals, bottleneck guitar, acoustic guitar, harmonica, mandolin, piano, liner notes
 Bob Livingston – bass, guitar, backing vocals
 Boomer Castleman – electric guitar, technician
 Leonard Arnold – guitar, steel guitar
 Gary P. Nunn – bass, piano, backing vocals, keyboards, guitar
 Karl Himmel – drums
 Kenneth A. Buttrey – drums, percussion
 Charles John Quarto – vocals, "constant encouragement" 
Jimmy Horowitz - string arrangements

Production
 Bob Johnston – producer
 Pat Lawrence – executive producer
 Neil Wilburn – engineer
 Brendan Morris – master tape research
 Gavin Lurssen – mastering
 Bob Potter – engineer
 Thane Tierney – for Hip-O Select
 Dana Smart – reissue supervisor
 Mathieu Bitton – design
 Ron Burnham – photography
 Michele Horie – art direction, production coordination
 William Holloway – drawing

References

External links
 Michael Martin Murphey's Official Website

1972 debut albums
Michael Martin Murphey albums
Cadillac (album)
A&M Records albums
Albums produced by Bob Johnston